Richard Foster Flint (March 1, 1902 -  June 6, 1976) was an American geologist.

Biography 
He was born in Chicago on March 1, 1902.

Flint graduated from the University of Chicago and earned his Ph.D. in geology at the University of California graduating in 1925. He then joined Yale as a member of the faculty, becoming a full professor in 1945.

Flint was recognized for his leadership role in Quaternary period geology with extensive work on effects of glaciations in northeastern America.

He also performed research in Washington State to understand the last ice age’s impact on the Northwest, gaining some notoriety for his opposition to the Missoula Floods hypothesis, which was posed by J Harlen Bretz. He presented a detailed and thoughtful argument against the possibility of catastrophic floods; a position which has subsequently fallen into disfavor based on a wide collection of evidence.

He died on June 6, 1976, in New Haven, Connecticut.

Major publications include 
Outlines of Physical Geology, 1941
Introduction to Geology, 1962
Radiocarbon measurements, 1967
Glacial Geology and the Pleistocene Epoch (Glacial and Pleistocene Geology), 1957
Glacial and Quaternary Geology, 1971

Honors 
In 1972 he was awarded the Prestwich Medal, a medal awarded by the Geological Society of London, for significant contributions in the science of Geology.

References 

20th-century American geologists
Quaternary geologists
1902 births
1976 deaths
University of Chicago alumni
University of California, Berkeley alumni